The mass media in Malaysia includes television, radio, newspapers, and web-based media such as bloggers. Many media outlets are either owned directly by the government of Malaysia (e.g. Bernama) or owned by component parties of the Barisan Nasional coalition which formed the government until May 2018 (e.g. the Media Prima group, which is owned by the United Malays National Organisation). Opposition parties PAS and PKR, now the main parties of the ruling "Pakatan Harapan" coalition, publish their own newspapers, Harakah and Suara Keadilan, respectively, which are openly sold alongside regular publications.

Since conventional media is so tightly controlled by the government, Malaysia has a lively alternative media scene, characterised by such news portals as Malaysiakini and The Malaysian Insider which take advantage of the government's pledge not to censor the Internet despite its stranglehold on most mass media outlets.

Newspapers

There are over 30 newspapers and tabloids published mainly in Malay, English, Chinese and Tamil. The most prominent newspapers include The Star, New Straits Times, theSun, Berita Harian, Utusan Malaysia, Sin Chew Jit Poh and Nanyang Siang Pau.

Television and radio

State-owned RTM operates six free-to-air terrestrial local television channels licensed to broadcast in Malaysia, as well as 34 radio channels nationwide. Meanwhile, Media Prima is the parent company of four television channels and five radio channels.

Privately owned by Astro Malaysia Holdings, Astro is Malaysia's current only satellite television provider. There are 200 channels to choose from at a minimum amount of RM 49.95 per month and at a maximum amount of RM 200.00 per month. Astro had 20 radio channels, of which 17 are Astro-branded radio stations, of which nine of them are available via FM radio.

HyppTV by Unifi is one of Malaysia's IPTV provider but to take the TV package, the customer must select at least one internet package, from RM 149 per month to RM 350 per month.

TV Sarawak (TVS) becomes the first regional TV station from Sarawak in Malaysia to have its own TV station. Albeit not the first in the Sarawak history as back in the April 1998, NTV7 was launched by Sarawakian businessman, Mohd Effendi Norwawi under the entity of Natseven TV Sdn Bhd, before acquired by Media Prima Berhad in 2005. With its own TV station, it will help to counter the problem of state's low priority and under coverage news by Peninsular-based media and increasing the power of East Malaysia representation.

Freedom
The regulated freedom of the press has been criticised. Although critics concede that journalists "probably won't be hauled off and shot" for being critical of the government, it has been claimed that the government creates a chilling effect through threats of reduced employment opportunities and refusing journalists' family members "a place at one of the better public universities". Legislation such as the Printing Presses and Publications Act have also been cited as curtailing freedom of expression.

In 2007, a government agency – the Malaysian Communications and Multimedia Commission – issued a directive to all private television and radio stations to refrain from broadcasting speeches made by opposition leaders. The move was condemned by politicians from the opposition Democratic Action Party. The directive was later withdrawn by the Energy, Water and Communications Ministry.

Malaysia was ranked 141 out of 178 countries in the Press Freedom Index by Reporters Without Borders in 2010 and 122 out of 179 countries in 2012. Malaysia was ranked 119 out of 179 countries in the Press Freedom Index in 2021.

Because of troop sensitivities, newspapers from Singapore cannot be sold in Malaysia, hence The Straits Times and other Singapore titles are not sold in Malaysia, while the New Straits Times and other Malaysian titles are not sold in Singapore. The ban was imposed before the 1 May 1969 general election in Malaysia.

Notes and references

Further reading
 

 
Malaysia
Malaysia